The Ibero-American University, also referred to by its acronym UIA but commonly known as Ibero or La Ibero) is a private, Catholic, Mexican higher education institution, sponsored by the Mexican province of the Society of Jesus. In 2009, the UIA received the SEP-ANUIES Prize as the best private university in Mexico. The Ibero's flagship campus is located in the Santa Fe district of Mexico City. It is ranked by QS World University Rankings as 701-750 worldwide and 7 in Mexico.

Its main library, Biblioteca Francisco Xavier Clavigero, holds more than 400,000 books and journals and as of 2007 is one of the largest university libraries in the country. It also has one of the largest law libraries in Mexico.

Other institutions affiliated with, but independent from, Ibero in Mexico City are found in Guadalajara, León, Torreón, Puebla, Playas de Tijuana, and Jaltepec. Together, they form the Jesuit University System, a network of Jesuit-run private universities.

History

The university was founded in 1943 by the Society of Jesus, but with the significant aid of Rodolfo Brito Foucher, the rector of the National Autonomous University of Mexico. Brito Foucher, a lawyer and head of UNAM's law faculty before becoming rector, was of the opinion that this was not counter to the Constitution of 1917's prohibition of Catholic involvement in education, since the article did not specify higher education but only primary and secondary. A key group in the founding of Ibero was former student activists from the Jesuit-directed  (UNEC). The founding came at a time when church-state relations in Mexico had improved over the late 1920s during the Cristero War and in the 1930s when the government attempted to implement education toward socialism in the Mexican universities.

Originally called Centro Cultural Universitario, Ibero grew into a full-scale university after ten years  due to the patronage of the business community which donated funds for building the campus and for guaranteeing loans as the university was being established.  When the Mexican economy expanded during the 1940s to 1960s, Ibero-trained professionals who entered the private sector, many of the former leaders of the UNEC served on the university's board of trustees. Ibero had the aim of promoting Catholic culture and of training elites to take leading roles in Mexican society. Ibero has trained a number of successful businessmen and politicians, including the successful presidential candidate of the National Action Party (Mexico), Vicente Fox.

The Society of Jesus has from its start in the 16th century been a leader in humanistic education. When Jesuits reached New Spain in 1572, their religious and educational zeal led them to create renowned teaching and research centers – such as the colleges of St. Ildefonso, Vizcainas, and St. Peter and St. Paul, to mention a few of the prestigious institutions of that time. The Ibero is part of a network of 8 Jesuit universities located in various Mexican cities which, in turn, are part of 31 Jesuit universities and colleges in Latin American and some 200 worldwide.

Campus

In 1988 Universidad Iberoamericana moved to a 48-acre (19 hectares) new campus in the Santa Fe area of Mexico City. Besides classrooms, laboratories, and workshops in physics, chemistry, photography, design, psychology, engineering, communications, architecture, and nutrition, the university houses the Francisco Xavier Clavigero library, the FM 90.9 radio station, and several auditoriums. Other facilities on campus include sports fields and related conveniences, a medical center, three cafeterias, an on-campus bookstore, a stationery shop, bank branches, and other university stores.

Ibero-American University Tijuana

Ibero-American University Tijuana (Universidad Iberoamericana Tijuana) in Playas de Tijuana, Tijuana, Mexico, was founded by the Jesuits in 1982. It is a part of the Mexican Jesuit University System. as one of the Universidad Iberoamericana Ciudad de México colleges.

In 1982, Universidad Iberoamericana opened its campus in Tijuana at two sites, one rented and the other on the premises of La Paz College. Later space was rented in the Civil Hospital building. At first only high school studies and degrees in architecture, graphic design, and law were offered. In 1985, the cornerstone was laid for the present building.

Departments
Today the university's Mexico City Campus is made up of 19 academic departments, which offer a total of 36 academic programs.
           
Art Department
Religious Sciences Department
Social & Political Sciences Department
Economics Department
Philosophy Department
History Department
Literature Department
Management & Public Accountancy Department 
Architecture Department

Communications Department
Law Department
Design Department
International Studies Department
Physics and Math Department
Engineering Department
Chemical Engineering & Sciences Department
Psychology Department
Health Department

Faculty

Luis E. Miramontes  – Chemist, inventor of the first oral contraceptive
Guillermo Arriaga – Screenwriter of Amores perros, Babel, 21 Grams and other films. Oscar Nominee
José Miguel Insulza – Chilean politician and Secretary General of the Organization of American States.
Jorge González Torres – Founder of the Ecologist Green Party of Mexico
Demetrio Sodi – Former congressman and senator
Loretta Ortíz Ahlf; researcher and the only Mexican invited as a lecturer to The Hague Academy of International Law
Augusto H. Álvarez – Architect (Torre Latinoamericana and Mexico City International Airport)
Rodolfo Barragán Schwarz – Architect
Isaac Broid Zajman – Architect (Telcel Building)
Enrique Carral Icaza – Architect (Mexico City International Airport)
Juan José Díaz Infante Núñez – Architect
Carlos Mijares Bracho – Architect
J. Francisco Serrano Cacho – Architect
Sylvia Schmelkes – Sociologist and education researcher
  Leonardo Javier Torres Nafarrate; Sociologist researcher, specialized on Niklas Luhmann's theories
 Arturo Zaldívar Lelo de Larrea, former Justice of the Mexican Supreme Court of Justice of the Nation

Alumni

Its most famous alumnus is Vicente Fox Quesada, President of Mexico 2000-2006. Other distinguished alums with high name recognition internationally are actress Salma Hayek; Academy Award-winning film maker Alejandro González Iñárritu; and journalist Jorge Ramos.

Athletics
Gerardo Torrado – Notable Mexican footballer
 Yon de Luisa – President of the Mexican Football Association
El Hijo del Santo – professional wrestler

Business
Gustavo Cantu Duran - chairman and CEO Seguros Monterrey New York Life
Germán Ahumada Russek – president and CEO of Consorcio ARA
Carlos Alazraki – president and CEO of the award-winning Alazraki & Asociados Publicidad agency
Joaquin Avila – managing partner at EMX Capital, former fund head at Carlyle Group Mexico, former managing director and Head of Latin America at Lehman Brothers
Emilio Azcárraga Jean – president and owner of Televisa the most important media network in Latin America
Genaro Borrego – vice-president of FEMSA
Gerardo Castaneda - technology innovator AWS
Fernando Chico Pardo – president of ASUR
Justino Compeán Palacios – president of Femexfut
Jaime Costa Lavín – president of SCA Latinoamérica
Javier de la Calle Pardo- CEO of Nacional Monte de Piedad
Valentín Diez Morodo – member of the board of Grupo Modelo
Carlos Manuel Flores Nuñez – CEO of Grupo Editorial Nomutsa
Carlos González Zabalegui – president of Comercial Mexicana
Carlos Guzmán Bofill – CEO of Hewlett-Packard México
Roberto Hernández Ramírez – president of Banamex and member of the board of Citibank
Leon Kraig Eskenazi – partner and managing director of IGNIA Partners L.L.C. and former president of Mars Inc. in Latin America
Fernando Landeros Verdugo – CEO of Fundación Teletón
Marcos Martínez Gavica – CEO of Grupo Santander
Manuel Medina Mora Escalante – CEO of Grupo Financiero Banamex and Citi Latinamerica
Bruno José Newman Flores – CEO of Grupo Zimat
Luis Orvañanos Lascurain – president and CEO of Grupo GEO
Luis Peña Kegel – president and CEO of HSBC México
Roberto Ricossa – CMO of Avaya
Daniel Servitje – President and CEO of Grupo Bimbo
Alejandro Soberón Kuri – president and CEO of CIE
Olegario Vázquez Aldir – CEO of Grupo Empresarial Ángeles and son of Olegario Vázquez Raña

Film
Miguel Rico Tavera – film screenwriter, producer and director (Padre Pro, Espiritu de Triunfo and more than 2,500 TV commercials and documentaries)
Guillermo Arriaga – film screenwriter, novelist and director (Amores Perros, 21 Grams and Babel)
Daniel Birman Ripstein – film producer (El Crimen del Padre Amaro, El callejón de los milagros and other films)
Alejandro González Iñárritu – filmmaker (Amores Perros, 21 Grams,  Babel, Birdman, and The Revenant)
Salma Hayek – Mexican actress
Alejandro Lozano – film director (Matando Cabos)
Arturo Ripstein – film director and producer (El callejón de los milagros and Directing Principio y Fin)
Antonio Serrano – film director/screenwriter (Sexo, Pudor y Lágrimas)
Nicole Vanden Broeck – film director

History, philosophy, literature, art and architecture
Graciela Abascal – painter
Angélica Argüelles Kubli – artist
Mauricio Beuchot – philosopher, poet and Dominican friar
Tatiana Bilbao – Mexican architect
Isaac Broid Zajman – Mexican architect
Clara de Buen Richkarday – Mexican architect
Fernanda Canales – Mexican architect
Frida Escobedo – Mexican architect
Pedro Friedeberg – Mexican painter
Victor Legorreta – Mexican architect
David Miklos – novelist
Paulina Morán – Mexican designer
Enrique Norten – Mexican architect
Aurelio Nuño Morales – Mexican architect
Silvia Pardo – painter
Isabel Rico De Garcia – curator/art historian (Instituto Cultural De Mexico)
Michel Rojkind – Mexican architect and former musician of Russian descent
Fernando Romero – architect
J. Francisco Serrano Cacho – architect
Esteban Suárez – Mexican architect
Ignacio Padilla – writer

Politics and Public Sector
 José Guillermo Anaya Llamas – Senator
 Diego Fernández de Cevallos – 1994 presidential candidate and politician
 Emilio Gamboa Patrón – former Secretary of State and now Parliamentary Coordinator for the Partido Revolucionario Institucional.
 Vicente Fox Quesada – former President of Mexico (2000–2006).
 Cecilia Landerreche (es.) – Director of the DIF
 Gustavo Madero Muñoz – Senator
 Juan Carlos Natale – Congressist
 Demetrio Sodi – politician
 Josefina Vázquez Mota – 2012 presidential candidate and Congressist
 Mabel Gómez Oliver – Member of the Foreign Service and Ambassador

Television and mass media
Javier Aceves (Baxter) – Radio DJ
Brooke Baldwin – CNN anchor
Rosy Ocampo – television producer
Jaime Smeke Balas – entrepreneur
Jorge Ceballos Castelo – Pionero Social Media México
Erick Hernández Villar –mMotion graphics developer
Héctor Aguilar Camín – Mexican writer, journalist and historian.
Gabriela Hill – host of Poker After Dark (Full Tilt Poker en la noche) in Spanish-speaking Latin America
Jorge Ramos – journalist
Juan Ruiz Healy – Anchorman, television producer, political columnist and documentalist
Vero Rodríguez – Sports journalist and television host

Science and engineering
Rodrigo Cárdenas Domínguez — engineer physicist, CEO and owner of Infinity Technologies

See also
 Association of Jesuit Colleges and Universities
 List of alumni of Jesuit educational institutions
 List of Jesuit sites
 List of universities in Mexico
 Iberoamerican University Torreón
 Universidad Iberoamericana León
 Western Institute of Technology and Higher Education

Bibliography
Espinosa, David.  Jesuit Student Groups, the Universidad Iberoamericana, and Political Resistance in Mexico. Albuquerque: University of New Mexico Press 2014 
Meneses Morales, Ernesto. La Universidad Iberoamericana en el Contexto de la Educación Superior Contemporanea. Mexico City: UIA 1979.

References

External links

Official website

 
Universities in Mexico City
Educational institutions established in 1943
1943 establishments in Mexico
Jesuit universities and colleges in Mexico